.online is a generic top-level domain (gTLD) of the Domain Name System (DNS) used in the Internet.

History 
In 2012, ICANN announced it would be expanding the range of domain extensions to further organize the Internet with new TLD's being requested by multiple parties. Six companies including Radix, Tucows, Namecheap, I-Registry Ltd., WhatBox?, and Donuts (Bitter Frostbite, LLC) filed applications for this TLD.

The .online TLD was launched in August 2015. It is currently owned and operated by Radix, founded by Bhavin Turakhia. Initially, it was a joint venture between Radix, Tucows, and Namecheap after they won the rights to .online in a private auction in 2014. Radix bought out full rights from Namecheap and Tucows to become the exclusive owner of the TLD in 2015.

The TLD was the first to register over 38,000 domains in the first 24 hours making it the largest new gTLD launch of its time. In November 2015, .online became the fastest new gTLD to exceed 100,000 registrations and, as of 2018, surpassed 1 million registrations from over 230 countries making it the 5th largest nTLD by zone size. Based on an internal analysis by Radix, 65% of developed .online domains are in use by SMBs while the company has generated over $13M in total revenue to date from the gTLD.

In 2017, .ONLINE won the Best New gTLD Award at the Global Domain Summit in China.

Usage
This gTLD is used by an array of websites. In 2017, Casino.online sold for $201,250 to become the largest new gTLD sale of its time.

References

External links 
 .online Domains Official site
 .online on Radix
 .online on ICANNWiki

Computer-related introductions in 2015
Generic top-level domains